Thiththa Aththa is a 2019 Sri Lankan Sinhalese comedy film directed and produced by Prithiraj Weerarathna. It stars Tennison Cooray in lead role along with Don Guy, Sanath Gunathilake, Susila Kottage and Rajitha Hiran in supportive roles. Music composed by Iraj Weerarathne.

Cast
 Tennison Cooray Walgama, Walisinghe's secretary 
 Don Guy as Minister Walisinghe
 Sanath Gunathilake
 Rajitha Hiran as Vise Kurutta
 Wilson Karunaratne
 Susila Kottage
 Nilmini Kottegoda
 D.B. Gangodathenna
 Chathura Perera
 Udaya Kumari
 Sando Harris
 Mervyn Silva
 Madushani Wickramasinghe
 Manel Chandralatha

Songs
The film consists with three songs.

References

External links
 

2019 films
2010s Sinhala-language films
2019 comedy films
Sri Lankan comedy films